King Khagemba (Conqueror of the Chinese; 1597–1654), was a monarch from the Kingdom of Kangleipak. He also introduced a new form of polo and new apparel styles. Under his regime he focused on a new form of Manipur and built many markets in different places like the Ema market. 
During his regime many Chinese workers built bridges and walls.The present-day Kangla gate was also built by captured Chinese workers who taught the Manipuris how to make bricks.
He was called "The conqueror of the Chinese" or "Khagemba"(khage-Chinese and ngamba-win over) after defeating the Chinese at the northern border of the kingdom.
Also during his time Manipur introduced coins widely in the kingdom. Under his regime there was a migration of muslims into the kingdom and Manipur established  good relationships with the Mughal Empire.

See also
List of Manipuri kings
Manipur (princely state)

References 

History of Manipur
Sanamahists
Meitei royalty
1597 births
1652 deaths
Ningthoucha dynasty